Leonard Charles Jardine (October 6, 1937 – October 15, 2010) was an American football coach and player. He played at Purdue University from 1957 to 1959 and led the team in scoring receptions in 1959. Jardine was the head football coach at Loyola Academy in Wilmette, Illinois from 1960 to 1963 and was an assistant coach at Purdue under Jack Mollenkopf from 1964 to 1966. After Purdue went to the Rose Bowl at the end of the 1966 season, Jardine was hired by Brown University to replace coach John McLaughry. Jardine coached at Brown for six seasons, finishing with a record of 9–44–1.  He died on October 15, 2010, in Chicago.

Head coaching record

College

References

1937 births
2010 deaths
American football ends
American football guards
Brown Bears football coaches
Purdue Boilermakers football players
Purdue Boilermakers football coaches
High school football coaches in Illinois
Sportspeople from Chicago
Players of American football from Chicago